Kana Kandaen is a 2005 Indian Tamil-language thriller film directed by K. V. Anand in his directorial debut, and produced by P. L. Thenappan. The film stars Srikanth, Prithviraj, Gopika, and Vivek. The music was composed by Vidyasagar with cinematography by Soundarrajan and editing by V. T. Vijayan. It was dubbed into Hindi as Muqabala, Telugu as Karthavyam, and Malayalam as Kana Kandaen. The film released on 13 May 2005.

The film marks Prithviraj's Tamil debut, and he played the antagonist. The title of this film is based on a song from Parthiban Kanavu (2003).

Plot
Bhaskar and Archana are childhood friends who grew up in the same village. Bhaskar receives a marriage invitation card from Archana. Only then does he realizes his love for her, but he still decides to attend the marriage. The day before the marriage, Archana finds out that her fiancé is not a good man and decides to call off the wedding. Her mother helps her escape with Bhaskar. The couple begins to live in a small house owned by Sivaramakrishnan. Bhaskar, a research scholar in chemistry, succeeds in coming out with a prototype of a desalination plant which he wants to give to the government and solve a water crisis. He gets discouraged by the government authorities and State Minister. Because of this, he decides to set up his own desalination plant based on the methods of his research. Along with Archana, he runs from pillar to post for a loan. Bhaskar is hesitant to express his love towards Archana as she may misinterpret his intentions for helping her, but she soon realizes his love for her.

Madhan is a college mate of Archana. He gets acquainted with their family. Coming to know of their troubles, the rich Madhan volunteers to help them and lends money. However, Madhan is a '"business consultant" who lends money to companies, corporates, and individuals at exorbitant rates of interest and uses his might to recover them. In Bhaskar's case, he fakes the bond papers that Bhaskar has signed and begins to trouble them, demanding his money back and threatening to take over Bhaskar's research works with which he aspires to make a huge sum. When everything goes out of hand for Madhan, he sets a bomb in Bhaskar's research plant, but Bhaskar thwarts the plan. The video records that Bhaskar had recovered earlier from Madhan's office showing his cruel side was released to the press, and an arrest warrant was issued for him. The film ends with Bhaskar getting recognized for his research work, while Madhan was shown roaming aimlessly around like a mentally affected person.

Cast
 Srikanth as Bhaskar
 Prithviraj as Madhan
 Gopika as Archana
Swetha Bharathi as Young Archana
 Vivek as Sivaramakrishnan
 Amitha Rajan as Vasantha Madam
 Vanitha Krishnachandran as Archana's mother
 Mayoori as Madhan's fake wife
 Singamuthu
 Linda Arsenio as item number

Production 
Noted cinematographer K. V. Anand made his directorial debut with this film. Malayalam actor Prithviraj was signed to make his Tamil debut with this film. He portrays the antagonist.

Soundtrack
The music is composed by Vidyasagar and lyrics were written by Vairamuthu.

Release 
Rediff gave the film a favourable review and wrote that "On the whole, K. V. Anand has made a very good romantic thriller".

Legacy 
Following his successful portrayal of an antagonist in this film, Prithviraj received many offers to play villain roles in Tamil cinema but he rejected them citing his interest to  play hero roles. He later went on to portray negative roles in Raavanan (2010) and Kaaviya Thalaivan (2014).

References

External links
 

2005 films
2000s Tamil-language films
Indian action thriller films
Films scored by Vidyasagar
Films about social issues in India
2005 directorial debut films
2005 action thriller films
Films directed by K. V. Anand